This is a list of butterflies of Zimbabwe. About 527 species are known from Zimbabwe, 22 of which are endemic.

Papilionidae

Papilioninae

Papilionini
Papilio nireus lyaeus Doubleday, 1845
Papilio dardanus cenea Stoll, 1790
Papilio constantinus Ward, 1871
Papilio demodocus Esper, [1798]
Papilio echerioides chirindanus van Son, 1956
Papilio ophidicephalus chirinda van Son, 1939

Leptocercini
Graphium antheus (Cramer, 1779)
Graphium policenes (Cramer, 1775)
Graphium junodi (Trimen, 1893)
Graphium colonna (Ward, 1873)
Graphium porthaon (Hewitson, 1865)
Graphium angolanus (Goeze, 1779)
Graphium morania (Angas, 1849)
Graphium leonidas (Fabricius, 1793)

Pieridae

Coliadinae
Eurema brigitta (Stoll, [1780])
Eurema desjardinsii marshalli (Butler, 1898)
Eurema regularis (Butler, 1876)
Eurema hapale (Mabille, 1882)
Eurema hecabe solifera (Butler, 1875)
Catopsilia florella (Fabricius, 1775)
Colias electo (Linnaeus, 1763)

Pierinae
Colotis amata calais (Cramer, 1775)
Colotis antevippe gavisa (Wallengren, 1857)
Colotis auxo (Lucas, 1852)
Colotis celimene amina (Hewitson, 1866)
Colotis danae annae (Wallengren, 1857)
Colotis dissociatus (Butler, 1897)
Colotis euippe mediata Talbot, 1939
Colotis euippe omphale (Godart, 1819)
Colotis evagore antigone (Boisduval, 1836)
Colotis evenina evenina (Wallengren, 1857)
Colotis evenina casta (Gerstaecker, 1871)
Colotis evenina sipylus (Swinhoe, 1884)
Colotis ione (Godart, 1819)
Colotis pallene (Hopffer, 1855)
Colotis regina (Trimen, 1863)
Colotis vesta argillaceus (Butler, 1877)
Colotis vesta mutans (Butler, 1877)
Colotis eris (Klug, 1829)
Colotis subfasciatus (Swainson, 1833)
Colotis agoye (Wallengren, 1857)
Eronia leda (Boisduval, 1847)
Pinacopterix eriphia (Godart, [1819])
Nepheronia argia mhondana (Suffert, 1904)
Nepheronia buquetii (Boisduval, 1836)
Nepheronia thalassina sinalata (Suffert, 1904)
Leptosia alcesta inalcesta Bernardi, 1959
Leptosia nupta pseudonupta Bernardi, 1959

Pierini
Appias epaphia contracta (Butler, 1888)
Appias sabina phoebe (Butler, 1901)
Pontia helice (Linnaeus, 1764)
Mylothris agathina (Cramer, 1779)
Mylothris carcassoni van Son, 1948 (endemic)
Mylothris rubricosta attenuata Talbot, 1944
Mylothris rueppellii haemus (Trimen, 1879)
Mylothris sagala umtaliana d'Abrera, 1980
Mylothris yulei Butler, 1897
Dixeia doxo parva Talbot, 1943
Dixeia leucophanes Vári, 1976
Dixeia pigea (Boisduval, 1836)
Dixeia spilleri (Spiller, 1884)
Belenois aurota (Fabricius, 1793)
Belenois creona severina (Stoll, 1781)
Belenois gidica abyssinica (Lucas, 1852)
Belenois thysa (Hopffer, 1855)
Belenois zochalia (Boisduval, 1836)

Lycaenidae

Miletinae

Liphyrini
Aslauga atrophifurca Cottrell, 1981 (endemic)
Aslauga marshalli Butler, 1899

Miletini
Spalgis lemolea Druce, 1890
Lachnocnema bibulus (Fabricius, 1793)
Lachnocnema pseudobibulus Libert, 1996
Lachnocnema durbani Trimen & Bowker, 1887
Lachnocnema brimoides Libert, 1996
Thestor basutus (Wallengren, 1857)

Poritiinae

Liptenini
Alaena amazoula ochroma Vári, 1976
Alaena nyassa Hewitson, 1877
Pentila pauli obsoleta Hawker-Smith, 1933
Pentila swynnertoni Stempffer & Bennett, 1961
Pentila tropicalis fuscipunctata Henning & Henning, 1994
Ornipholidotos peucetia (Hewitson, 1866)
Cooksonia neavei rhodesiae Pinhey, 1962
Mimacraea marshalli Trimen, 1898
Mimacraea neokoton Druce, 1907 (endemic)
Teriomima puellaris (Trimen, 1894)
Baliochila barnesi Stempffer & Bennett, 1953
Baliochila lipara Stempffer & Bennett, 1953
Baliochila singularis Stempffer and Bennett, 1953
Cnodontes pallida (Trimen, 1898)

Epitolini
Deloneura sheppardi Stevenson, 1934
Deloneura subfusca Hawker-Smith, 1933

Aphnaeinae
Lipaphnaeus aderna spindasoides (Aurivillius, 1916)
Chloroselas argentea Riley, 1932 (endemic)
Chloroselas mazoensis (Trimen, 1898)
Chloroselas pseudozeritis (Trimen, 1873)
Crudaria leroma (Wallengren, 1857)
Cigaritis brunnea (Jackson, 1966)
Cigaritis ella (Hewitson, 1865)
Cigaritis homeyeri (Dewitz, 1887)
Cigaritis mozambica (Bertoloni, 1850)
Cigaritis natalensis (Westwood, 1851)
Cigaritis nyassae (Butler, 1884)
Cigaritis phanes (Trimen, 1873)
Cigaritis victoriae (Butler, 1884)
Zeritis sorhagenii (Dewitz, 1879)
Axiocerses tjoane (Wallengren, 1857)
Axiocerses susanae Henning & Henning, 1996 (endemic)
Axiocerses coalescens Henning & Henning, 1996
Axiocerses amanga (Westwood, 1881)
Axiocerses punicea cruenta (Trimen, 1894)
Aloeides aranda (Wallengren, 1857)
Aloeides trimeni Tite & Dickson, 1973
Aloeides damarensis mashona Tite & Dickson, 1973
Aloeides molomo coalescens Tite & Dickson, 1973
Aloeides taikosama (Wallengren, 1857)
Aloeides plowesi Tite & Dickson, 1973 (endemic)
Aloeides mullini Henning & Henning, 1996 (endemic)
Aphnaeus erikssoni barnesi Stempffer, 1954
Aphnaeus erikssoni mashunae Stempffer, 1954
Aphnaeus hutchinsonii Trimen & Bowker, 1887
Aphnaeus marshalli Neave, 1910

Theclinae
Myrina dermaptera nyassae Talbot, 1935
Myrina silenus ficedula Trimen, 1879
Hypolycaena buxtoni Hewitson, 1874
Hypolycaena lochmophila Tite, 1967
Hypolycaena philippus (Fabricius, 1793)
Hypolycaena tearei Henning, 1981
Hemiolaus caeculus (Hopffer, 1855)
Leptomyrina hirundo (Wallengren, 1857)
Leptomyrina gorgias sobrina Talbot, 1935
Leptomyrina henningi Dickson, 1976
Iolaus alienus Trimen, 1898
Iolaus australis Stevenson, 1937
Iolaus bakeri (Riley, 1928)
Iolaus mimosae rhodosense (Stempffer & Bennett, 1959)
Iolaus nasisii (Riley, 1928)
Iolaus penningtoni (Stempffer & Bennett, 1959)
Iolaus sidus Trimen, 1864
Iolaus violacea (Riley, 1928)
Iolaus pallene (Wallengren, 1857)
Iolaus trimeni Wallengren, 1875
Iolaus lalos (Druce, 1896)
Iolaus silarus Druce, 1885
Iolaus poultoni (Riley, 1928)
Stugeta bowkeri tearei Dickson, 1980
Pilodeudorix obscurata (Trimen, 1891)
Pilodeudorix zeloides (Butler, 1901)
Deudorix antalus (Hopffer, 1855)
Deudorix caliginosa Lathy, 1903
Deudorix dariaves Hewitson, 1877
Deudorix dinochares Grose-Smith, 1887
Deudorix dinomenes Grose-Smith, 1887
Deudorix diocles Hewitson, 1869
Deudorix lorisona coffea Jackson, 1966
Deudorix magda Gifford, 1963
Deudorix vansoni Pennington, 1948
Capys connexivus Butler, 1897
Capys disjunctus Trimen, 1895

Polyommatinae

Lycaenesthini
Anthene amarah (Guérin-Méneville, 1849)
Anthene arnoldi (Jones, 1918)
Anthene barnesi Stevenson, 1940 (endemic)
Anthene butleri livida (Trimen, 1881)
Anthene chirinda (Bethune-Baker, 1910)
Anthene contrastata mashuna (Stevenson, 1937)
Anthene crawshayi (Butler, 1899)
Anthene definita (Butler, 1899)
Anthene irumu (Stempffer, 1948)
Anthene kersteni (Gerstaecker, 1871)
Anthene lasti (Grose-Smith & Kirby, 1894)
Anthene lemnos (Hewitson, 1878)
Anthene liodes (Hewitson, 1874)
Anthene lunulata (Trimen, 1894)
Anthene mpanda Kielland, 1990
Anthene nigropunctata (Bethune-Baker, 1910)
Anthene otacilia (Trimen, 1868)
Anthene princeps (Butler, 1876)
Anthene rhodesiana Stempffer, 1962
Anthene sheppardi Stevenson, 1940
Anthene talboti Stempffer, 1936
Anthene wilsoni (Talbot, 1935)
Anthene nigeriae (Aurivillius, 1905)

Polyommatini
Cupidopsis cissus (Godart, [1824])
Cupidopsis jobates (Hopffer, 1855)
Pseudonacaduba sichela (Wallengren, 1857)
Lampides boeticus (Linnaeus, 1767)
Uranothauma antinorii felthami (Stevenson, 1934)
Uranothauma falkensteini (Dewitz, 1879)
Uranothauma nubifer (Trimen, 1895)
Uranothauma poggei (Dewitz, 1879)
Uranothauma vansomereni Stempffer, 1951
Cacyreus lingeus (Stoll, 1782)
Cacyreus marshalli Butler, 1898
Cacyreus tespis (Herbst, 1804)
Cacyreus virilis Stempffer, 1936
Harpendyreus notoba (Trimen, 1868)
Leptotes babaulti (Stempffer, 1935)
Leptotes brevidentatus (Tite, 1958)
Leptotes jeanneli (Stempffer, 1935)
Leptotes pirithous (Linnaeus, 1767)
Leptotes pulchra (Murray, 1874)
Tuxentius calice (Hopffer, 1855)
Tuxentius melaena (Trimen & Bowker, 1887)
Tarucus sybaris (Hopffer, 1855)
Zintha hintza (Trimen, 1864)
Zizeeria knysna (Trimen, 1862)
Zizina antanossa (Mabille, 1877)
Actizera lucida (Trimen, 1883)
Zizula hylax (Fabricius, 1775)
Brephidium metophis (Wallengren, 1860)
Oraidium barberae (Trimen, 1868)
Azanus jesous (Guérin-Méneville, 1849)
Azanus mirza (Plötz, 1880)
Azanus moriqua (Wallengren, 1857)
Azanus natalensis (Trimen & Bowker, 1887)
Azanus ubaldus (Stoll, 1782)
Eicochrysops eicotrochilus Bethune-Baker, 1924
Eicochrysops hippocrates (Fabricius, 1793)
Eicochrysops messapus mahallakoaena (Wallengren, 1857)
Euchrysops barkeri (Trimen, 1893)
Euchrysops dolorosa (Trimen & Bowker, 1887)
Euchrysops malathana (Boisduval, 1833)
Euchrysops osiris (Hopffer, 1855)
Euchrysops subpallida Bethune-Baker, 1923
Thermoniphas colorata (Ungemach, 1932)
Oboronia bueronica Karsch, 1895
Freyeria trochylus (Freyer, [1843])
Lepidochrysops barnesi Pennington, 1953 (endemic)
Lepidochrysops chittyi Henning & Henning, 1994 (endemic)
Lepidochrysops chloauges (Bethune-Baker, [1923])
Lepidochrysops coxii (Pinhey, 1945) (endemic)
Lepidochrysops glauca glauca (Trimen & Bowker, 1887)
Lepidochrysops glauca swinburnei Stevenson, 1939
Lepidochrysops inyangae (Pinhey, 1945)
Lepidochrysops kocak Seven, 1997
Lepidochrysops letsea (Trimen, 1870)
Lepidochrysops longifalces Tite, 1961
Lepidochrysops mashuna (Trimen, 1894) (endemic)
Lepidochrysops patricia (Trimen & Bowker, 1887)
Lepidochrysops peculiaris hypoleucus (Butler, 1893)
Lepidochrysops plebeia (Butler, 1898)
Lepidochrysops ruthica Pennington, 1953 (endemic)
Lepidochrysops solwezii (Bethune-Baker, [1923])
Lepidochrysops vansoni (Swanepoel, 1949)
Lepidochrysops variabilis Cottrell, 1965
Lepidochrysops violetta (Pinhey, 1945) (endemic)

Nymphalidae

Libytheinae
Libythea labdaca laius Trimen, 1879

Danainae

Danaini
Danaus chrysippus orientis (Aurivillius, 1909)
Tirumala petiverana (Doubleday, 1847)
Amauris niavius dominicanus Trimen, 1879
Amauris albimaculata chirindana Talbot, 1941
Amauris echeria lobengula (Sharpe, 1890)
Amauris ochlea (Boisduval, 1847)

Satyrinae

Melanitini
Aeropetes tulbaghia (Linnaeus, 1764)
Gnophodes betsimena diversa (Butler, 1880)
Melanitis leda (Linnaeus, 1758)
Melanitis libya Distant, 1882
Aphysoneura pigmentaria vumba Kielland, 1989

Satyrini
Bicyclus angulosa selousi (Trimen, 1895)
Bicyclus anynana (Butler, 1879)
Bicyclus campina (Aurivillius, 1901)
Bicyclus condamini van Son, 1963 (endemic)
Bicyclus cooksoni (Druce, 1905)
Bicyclus cottrelli (van Son, 1952)
Bicyclus ena (Hewitson, 1877)
Bicyclus safitza (Westwood, 1850)
Heteropsis perspicua (Trimen, 1873)
Heteropsis simonsii (Butler, 1877)
Ypthima antennata van Son, 1955
Ypthima asterope (Klug, 1832)
Ypthima condamini Kielland, 1982
Ypthima granulosa Butler, 1883
Ypthima impura paupera Ungemach, 1932
Ypthima pupillaris Butler, 1888
Ypthima rhodesiana Carcasson, 1961
Ypthimomorpha itonia (Hewitson, 1865)
Mashuna mashuna (Trimen, 1895) (endemic)
Coenyropsis bera (Hewitson, 1877)
Coenyropsis natalii (Boisduval, 1847)
Physcaeneura panda (Boisduval, 1847)
Physcaeneura pione Godman, 1880
Neita extensa (Butler, 1898)
Pseudonympha cyclops van Son, 1955
Pseudonympha arnoldi van Son, 1941 (endemic)
Paternympha loxophthalma (Vári, 1971)
Stygionympha wichgrafi lannini van Son, 1966

Charaxinae

Charaxini
Charaxes varanes vologeses (Mabille, 1876)
Charaxes acuminatus vumba van Someren, 1963
Charaxes candiope (Godart, 1824)
Charaxes protoclea azota (Hewitson, 1877)
Charaxes macclounii Butler, 1895
Charaxes jasius saturnus Butler, 1866
Charaxes castor flavifasciatus Butler, 1895
Charaxes brutus natalensis Staudinger, 1885
Charaxes pollux gazanus van Someren, 1967
Charaxes druceanus proximans Joicey & Talbot, 1922
Charaxes druceanus stevensoni van Someren, 1963
Charaxes bohemani Felder & Felder, 1859
Charaxes xiphares vumbui van Son, 1936
Charaxes cithaeron cithaeron Felder & Felder, 1859
Charaxes cithaeron joanae van Someren, 1964
Charaxes violetta melloni Fox, 1963
Charaxes etesipe tavetensis Rothschild, 1894
Charaxes penricei Rothschild, 1900
Charaxes achaemenes Felder & Felder, 1867
Charaxes jahlusa argynnides Westwood, 1864
Charaxes jahlusa rex Henning, 1978
Charaxes baumanni selousi Trimen, 1894
Charaxes pseudophaeus van Someren, 1975
Charaxes manica Trimen, 1894
Charaxes fulgurata Aurivillius, 1899
Charaxes phaeus Hewitson, 1877
Charaxes vansoni van Someren, 1975
Charaxes gallagheri van Son, 1962
Charaxes guderiana (Dewitz, 1879)
Charaxes zoolina (Westwood, [1850])
Charaxes nichetes leoninus Butler, 1895
Charaxes zambeziensis Henning & Henning, 1994 (endemic)
Charaxes alpinus van Someren & Jackson, 1957 (endemic)

Euxanthini
Charaxes wakefieldi (Ward, 1873)

Apaturinae
Apaturopsis cleochares schultzei Schmidt, 1921

Nymphalinae

Nymphalini
Antanartia schaeneia dubia Howarth, 1966
Vanessa dimorphica (Howarth, 1966)
Vanessa cardui (Linnaeus, 1758)
Junonia artaxia Hewitson, 1864
Junonia hierta cebrene Trimen, 1870
Junonia natalica (Felder & Felder, 1860)
Junonia oenone (Linnaeus, 1758)
Junonia orithya madagascariensis Guenée, 1865
Junonia terea elgiva Hewitson, 1864
Junonia touhilimasa Vuillot, 1892
Salamis cacta eileenae Henning & Joannou, 1994
Protogoniomorpha anacardii nebulosa (Trimen, 1881)
Protogoniomorpha parhassus (Drury, 1782)
Precis actia Distant, 1880
Precis antilope (Feisthamel, 1850)
Precis archesia (Cramer, 1779)
Precis ceryne (Boisduval, 1847)
Precis cuama (Hewitson, 1864)
Precis octavia sesamus Trimen, 1883
Precis tugela Trimen, 1879
Hypolimnas anthedon wahlbergi (Wallengren, 1857)
Hypolimnas deceptor (Trimen, 1873)
Hypolimnas misippus (Linnaeus, 1764)
Catacroptera cloanthe (Stoll, 1781)

Cyrestinae

Cyrestini
Cyrestis camillus sublineata Lathy, 1901

Biblidinae

Biblidini
Byblia anvatara acheloia (Wallengren, 1857)
Byblia ilithyia (Drury, 1773)
Neptidopsis ophione nucleata Grünberg, 1911
Eurytela dryope angulata Aurivillius, 1899
Eurytela hiarbas lita Rothschild & Jordan, 1903

Epicaliini
Sevenia boisduvali (Wallengren, 1857)
Sevenia morantii (Trimen, 1881)
Sevenia natalensis (Boisduval, 1847)
Sevenia rosa (Hewitson, 1877)

Limenitinae

Limenitidini
Cymothoe alcimeda rhodesiae Stevenson, 1934
Cymothoe coranus Grose-Smith, 1889
Cymothoe vumbui Bethune-Baker, 1926
Pseudacraea boisduvalii trimenii Butler, 1874
Pseudacraea lucretia expansa (Butler, 1878)

Neptidini
Neptis alta Overlaet, 1955
Neptis carcassoni Van Son, 1959
Neptis goochii Trimen, 1879
Neptis jordani Neave, 1910
Neptis kiriakoffi Overlaet, 1955
Neptis laeta Overlaet, 1955
Neptis penningtoni van Son, 1977
Neptis saclava marpessa Hopffer, 1855
Neptis serena Overlaet, 1955
Neptis swynnertoni Trimen, 1912
Neptis trigonophora Butler, 1878

Adoliadini
Euryphura achlys (Hopffer, 1855)
Euryphura concordia (Hopffer, 1855)
Hamanumida daedalus (Fabricius, 1775)
Pseudargynnis hegemone (Godart, 1819)
Aterica galene theophane Hopffer, 1855
Bebearia orientis malawiensis Holmes, 2001
Euphaedra orientalis Rothschild, 1898
Euphaedra neophron (Hopffer, 1855)

Heliconiinae

Acraeini
Acraea cerasa Hewitson, 1861
Acraea acara Hewitson, 1865
Acraea anemosa Hewitson, 1865
Acraea boopis Wichgraf, 1914
Acraea cuva Grose-Smith, 1889
Acraea horta (Linnaeus, 1764)
Acraea insignis gorongozae van Son, 1963
Acraea machequena Grose-Smith, 1887
Acraea neobule Doubleday, 1847
Acraea rabbaiae perlucida Henning & Henning, 1996
Acraea satis Ward, 1871
Acraea acrita Hewitson, 1865
Acraea asema Hewitson, 1877
Acraea atolmis Westwood, 1881
Acraea egina areca Mabille, 1889
Acraea nohara nohara Boisduval, 1847
Acraea nohara halali Marshall, 1896
Acraea petraea Boisduval, 1847
Acraea pseudatolmis Eltringham, 1912 (endemic)
Acraea violarum Boisduval, 1847
Acraea aglaonice Westwood, 1881
Acraea atergatis Westwood, 1881
Acraea axina Westwood, 1881
Acraea caldarena Hewitson, 1877
Acraea lygus Druce, 1875
Acraea natalica Boisduval, 1847
Acraea oncaea Hopffer, 1855
Acraea stenobea Wallengren, 1860
Acraea aganice Hewitson, 1852
Acraea acerata Hewitson, 1874
Acraea cabira Hopffer, 1855
Acraea encedon (Linnaeus, 1758)
Acraea serena (Fabricius, 1775)
Acraea esebria Hewitson, 1861
Acraea goetzei Thurau, 1903
Acraea johnstoni Godman, 1885
Acraea burni Butler, 1896
Acraea pentapolis epidica Oberthür, 1893
Acraea anacreon Trimen, 1868
Acraea bomba Grose-Smith, 1889
Acraea induna Trimen, 1895
Acraea parei (Henning & Henning, 1996)
Acraea rahira Boisduval, 1833
Acraea igola Trimen & Bowker, 1889
Acraea vumbui Stevenson, 1934 (endemic)
Pardopsis punctatissima (Boisduval, 1833)

Argynnini
Issoria smaragdifera (Butler, 1895)

Vagrantini
Lachnoptera ayresii Trimen, 1879
Phalanta eurytis (Doubleday, 1847)
Phalanta phalantha aethiopica (Rothschild & Jordan, 1903)

Hesperiidae

Coeliadinae
Coeliades anchises (Gerstaecker, 1871)
Coeliades forestan (Stoll, [1782])
Coeliades libeon (Druce, 1875)
Coeliades pisistratus (Fabricius, 1793)
Coeliades sejuncta (Mabille & Vuillot, 1891)

Pyrginae

Celaenorrhinini
Celaenorrhinus bettoni Butler, 1902
Celaenorrhinus galenus biseriata (Butler, 1888)
Eretis djaelaelae (Wallengren, 1857)
Eretis melania Mabille, 1891
Eretis umbra nox (Neave, 1910)
Sarangesa astrigera Butler, 1894
Sarangesa laelius (Mabille, 1877)
Sarangesa lucidella (Mabille, 1891)
Sarangesa maculata (Mabille, 1891)
Sarangesa motozi (Wallengren, 1857)
Sarangesa phidyle (Walker, 1870)
Sarangesa ruona Evans, 1937
Sarangesa seineri Strand, 1909

Tagiadini
Tagiades flesus (Fabricius, 1781)
Eagris nottoana (Wallengren, 1857)
Calleagris jamesoni (Sharpe, 1890)
Caprona pillaana Wallengren, 1857
Netrobalane canopus (Trimen, 1864)
Leucochitonea levubu Wallengren, 1857
Abantis bamptoni Collins & Larsen, 1994
Abantis paradisea (Butler, 1870)
Abantis tettensis Hopffer, 1855
Abantis venosa Trimen & Bowker, 1889
Abantis zambesiaca (Westwood, 1874)

Carcharodini
Spialia asterodia (Trimen, 1864)
Spialia colotes transvaaliae (Trimen & Bowker, 1889)
Spialia confusa Evans, 1937
Spialia delagoae (Trimen, 1898)
Spialia depauperata australis de Jong, 1978
Spialia diomus ferax (Wallengren, 1863)
Spialia dromus (Plötz, 1884)
Spialia mafa (Trimen, 1870)
Spialia paula (Higgins, 1924)
Spialia secessus (Trimen, 1891)
Spialia spio (Linnaeus, 1764)
Gomalia elma (Trimen, 1862)

Hesperiinae

Aeromachini
Astictopterus stellata mineni (Trimen, 1894)
Ampittia capenas (Hewitson, 1868)
Kedestes barberae (Trimen, 1873)
Kedestes callicles (Hewitson, 1868)
Kedestes lema linka Evans, 1956
Kedestes macomo (Trimen, 1862)
Kedestes marshalli Aurivillius, 1925 (endemic)
Kedestes michaeli Gardiner & Hancock, 1982
Kedestes mohozutza (Wallengren, 1857)
Kedestes monostichus Hancock & Gardiner, 1982
Kedestes nerva paola Plötz, 1884
Kedestes wallengrenii (Trimen, 1883)
Gorgyra johnstoni (Butler, 1894)
Teniorhinus harona (Westwood, 1881)
Teniorhinus herilus (Hopffer, 1855)
Xanthodisca vibius (Hewitson, 1878)
Acada biseriata (Mabille, 1893)
Parosmodes morantii (Trimen, 1873)
Acleros mackenii (Trimen, 1868)
Acleros ploetzi Mabille, 1890
Semalea pulvina (Plötz, 1879)
Andronymus caesar philander (Hopffer, 1855)
Andronymus neander (Plötz, 1884)
Chondrolepis niveicornis (Plötz, 1883)
Zophopetes dysmephila (Trimen, 1868)
Artitropa erinnys nyasae Riley, 1925
Artitropa reducta Aurivillius, 1925
Fresna nyassae (Hewitson, 1878)
Platylesches affinissima Strand, 1921
Platylesches galesa (Hewitson, 1877)
Platylesches langa Evans, 1937
Platylesches moritili (Wallengren, 1857)
Platylesches neba (Hewitson, 1877)
Platylesches picanini (Holland, 1894)
Platylesches robustus Neave, 1910
Platylesches shona Evans, 1937
Platylesches tina Evans, 1937

Baorini
Zenonia zeno (Trimen, 1864)
Pelopidas mathias (Fabricius, 1798)
Pelopidas thrax (Hübner, 1821)
Borbo borbonica (Boisduval, 1833)
Borbo chagwa (Evans, 1937)
Borbo detecta (Trimen, 1893)
Borbo fallax (Gaede, 1916)
Borbo fanta (Evans, 1937)
Borbo fatuellus (Hopffer, 1855)
Borbo ferruginea dondo Evans, 1956
Borbo gemella (Mabille, 1884)
Borbo holtzi (Plötz, 1883)
Borbo lugens (Hopffer, 1855)
Borbo micans (Holland, 1896)
Parnara monasi (Trimen & Bowker, 1889)
Gegenes hottentota (Latreille, 1824)
Gegenes niso (Linnaeus, 1764)
Gegenes pumilio gambica (Mabille, 1878)

Heteropterinae
Metisella abdeli (Krüger, 1928)
Metisella aegipan inyanga Evans, 1956
Metisella metis paris Evans, 1937
Metisella willemi (Wallengren, 1857)
Tsitana tsita (Trimen, 1870)

See also
List of moths of Zimbabwe
Wildlife of Zimbabwe

References

Seitz, A. Die Gross-Schmetterlinge der Erde 13: Die Afrikanischen Tagfalter. Plates
Seitz, A. Die Gross-Schmetterlinge der Erde 13: Die Afrikanischen Tagfalter. Text 

Zimbabwe
Zimbabwe
Butterflies